Jenney may refer to:

People
Jack Jenney (1910–1945), jazz trombonist
Lucinda Jenney (born 1954), American actress
Neil Jenney (born 1945), self-taught artist
Newton-Jenney Party led by Henry Newton and Walter P. Jenney
Ralph E. Jenney (1883–1945), United States federal judge and attorney
William Le Baron Jenney (1832–1907), American architect and engineer

Locations
Jenney Grist Mill, working grist mill located in Plymouth, Massachusetts
Jenney Stockade Site, stage station on the Cheyenne-Deadwood route near Newcastle, Wyoming

See also
Janney (disambiguation)
Jeannie (disambiguation)
Jeanny (disambiguation)
Jennie (disambiguation)
Jenny (disambiguation)